Timoleon Vassos or Vasos ( or Βάσος; 1836–1929) was a Hellenic Army officer and general.

He was born in Athens in 1836, the younger son of the hero of the Greek Revolution Vasos Mavrovouniotis. He studied at the Hellenic Military Academy and continued his studies in France before being appointed as aide de camp to King George I. In February 1897, as a colonel, he was sent at the head of an expeditionary force to Crete to assist the local Cretan revolt against the Ottoman Empire, an act which precipitated the outbreak of the Greco-Turkish War of 1897. He eventually reached the rank of Major General and garrison commander of Athens. 

He died in Athens in October 1929.

References

1836 births
1929 deaths
Greek military personnel of the Greco-Turkish War (1897)
Hellenic Army major generals
Military personnel from Athens
Ottoman Crete
Greek people of Serbian descent